Giovannetti is an Italian surname, derived from the given name Giovanni. Notable people with the surname include:

Alberto Giovannetti (1913–1989), Vatican diplomat 
Luciano Giovannetti (born 1945), Italian sport shooter
Luciano Giovannetti (bishop) (born 1934), Italian Catholic bishop
Luigi Pericle Giovannetti or Luigi Pericle (1916–2001), Swiss painter, cartoonist and illustrator
Marco Giovannetti (born 1962), Italian cyclist
Matteo Giovannetti or Giovanetti (c. 1322 – 1368), Italian painter

Italian-language surnames
Patronymic surnames
Surnames from given names